Dr. Krieger may refer to:
Dr. Algernop Krieger, a character from Archer 
Eduardo Krieger, Brazilian physician